Route 131 is a Quebec highway running from Lavaltrie (junction of Route 138) to Saint-Michel-des-Saints in Lanaudière. This route, combined with Autoroute 31, provides the key route to Joliette, and then continues northward through Saint-Félix-de-Valois, Saint-Jean-de-Matha and Saint-Zénon for a distance of almost 140 km.

Municipalities along Route 131
 Lavaltrie
 Joliette
 Notre-Dame-des-Prairies
 Notre-Dame-de-Lourdes
 Saint-Félix-de-Valois
 Saint-Jean-de-Matha
 Saint-Émilie-de-l'Énergie
 Saint-Zénon
 Saint-Michel-des-Saints

See also
 List of Quebec provincial highways

References

External links  
 Provincial Route Map (Courtesy of the Quebec Ministry of Transportation) 
 Route 131 on Google Maps

131
Roads in Lanaudière
Joliette